Pasquale Di Molfetta (born 30 October 1957 in Foligno, Italy), better known as Linus is an Italian radio host and the artistic director of Radio Deejay.

Filmography

Movies
 Natale a casa Deejay, (2004)

References

Italian radio presenters
Italian radio personalities
Living people
1957 births
Musicians from Milan
People of Apulian descent